Han Song-ho is a North Korean former footballer. He represented North Korea on at least three occasions in 2000, but was also part of the squad at the 1998 Asian Games.

Career statistics

International

References

Date of birth unknown
Living people
North Korean footballers
North Korea international footballers
Association football goalkeepers
Liaoning F.C. players
North Korean expatriate footballers
North Korean expatriate sportspeople in China
Expatriate footballers in China
Footballers at the 1998 Asian Games
Asian Games competitors for North Korea
Year of birth missing (living people)